Taggart was a Scottish detective fiction television programme, created by Glenn Chandler, who has written many of the episodes, and made by STV Studios for the ITV network. The series revolves around a group of detectives initially in the Maryhill CID of Strathclyde Police, though various storylines have happened in other parts of the Greater Glasgow area, and as of the most recent series the team have operated out of the fictional John Street police station across the street from the Glasgow City Chambers. It was one of the UK's longest-running dramas and is the longest-running police drama after the cancellation of The Bill.

The series was preceded by the pilot miniseries "Killer", in 1983.

Episodes

Pilot (1983)

Series 1 (1985)

Series 2 (1986)

Series 3 (1987)

Christmas Special (1987)

Series 4 (1988)

Christmas Special (1988)

Series 5 (1989)

New Year's Special (1990)

Series 6 (1990)

Christmas Special (1990)

New Year Special (1992)

Series 7 (1992)

Series 8 (1992)

New Year's Special (1993)

Series 9 (1993)

New Year's Special (1994)

Series 10 (1994)

Series 11 (1995)

Series 12 (1996)

Series 13 (1997)

Series 14 (1998)

Series 15 (1999)

Series 16 (2000)

New Year's Special (2001)

Series 17 (2002)

Series 18 (2002–03)

Series 19 (2003–04)

Series 20 (2005)

Series 21 (2005)

Series 22 (2006)

Series 23 (2007)

Series 24 (2008)

Series 25 (2008)

Series 26 (2009)

Series 27 (2010)

References

External links
 
 

Lists of British crime television series episodes